Marginson is a surname. Notable people with the surname include:

Evan Marginson (1909–1977), Australian politician
Karl Marginson (born 1970), English football manager and player
Simon Marginson (born 1951), Australian higher education researcher

See also
Martinson

Surnames of English origin